Martin George Carruthers (born 7 August 1972) is an English former footballer who played as a forward for Aston Villa, Hull City, Stoke City, Peterborough United, York City, Darlington, Southend United, Scunthorpe United, Macclesfield Town, Boston United, Lincoln City and Cambridge United. He is currently manager of Matlock Town.

Career
Carruthers was born in Nottingham and began his career with Aston Villa. He failed to break into the first team at Villa Park and after a loan at Hull City where he scored six goals in 13 matches he joined Stoke City in July 1993. He scored nine goals in 45 appearances in 1993–94 as Stoke finished in 10th position. He scored eight goals in 42 matches in 1994–95. He struggled for form in 1995–96 scoring just three goals after losing his place in the side in 1996–97 he joined Peterborough United in November 1996. He spent three years at Peterborough scoring 21 goals in 67 league matches and after a short loan spell at York City he signed for Darlington.

He soon on to Southend United before enjoying the most prolific spell of his career at Scunthorpe United where he scored 34 goals in 86 league games. Carruthers then went on to play for Macclesfield Town, Boston United, Lincoln City and ended his professional career with Cambridge United.

He then went on to play non-league football, joining Grantham Town in 2005, and then Ilkeston Town (initially on loan) in 2006. He went on to become player-assistant manager at Ilkeston, before joining Arnold Town in 2008, becoming joint manager alongside Chris Freestone two games into the 2009–10 season. They both left the club in June 2012, and Carruthers subsequently signed for Basford United as a player in 2012, becoming player-manager in 2013. He departed the club in March 2019.

Coaching career
On 20 May 2019, he was appointed manager at Quorn. At the end of November, he departed the club to become head coach at Ilkeston Town linking up with his former Basford United assistant manager Mark Clifford who now owned the club. In the 2021–22 season, Ilkeston were promoted as champions of the Northern Premier League Division One Midlands. He left the club by mutual consent on 6 September 2022. On 15 December 2022, Carruthers was appointed manager of Matlock Town.

Personal life
After retiring, he became Education manager at Notts County's Academy.

Career statistics
Source:

A.  The "Other" column constitutes appearances and goals in the Football League Trophy, Football League play-offs and Full Members Cup.

References

External links
 Unofficial Martin Carruthers Profile at The Forgotten Imp

1972 births
Living people
Footballers from Nottingham
English footballers
Association football forwards
Premier League players
Aston Villa F.C. players
Hull City A.F.C. players
Stoke City F.C. players
Peterborough United F.C. players
York City F.C. players
Darlington F.C. players
Southend United F.C. players
Scunthorpe United F.C. players
Macclesfield Town F.C. players
Boston United F.C. players
Lincoln City F.C. players
Cambridge United F.C. players
Grantham Town F.C. players
Ilkeston Town F.C. (1945) players
Arnold Town F.C. players
Basford United F.C. players
English Football League players
Northern Premier League players
Arnold Town F.C. managers
Basford United F.C. managers
Ilkeston Town F.C. managers
Matlock Town F.C. managers
Northern Premier League managers
English football managers